Alexandra Sorina (Belarusian: Аляксандра Зорына, Russian: Александра Зорина; born Aleksandra Tsvikevich, 17 September 1899 – 31 May 1973) was a Russian Empire-born actress who had a career in Weimar Germany, mainly in film.

Selected filmography
 Peter the Great (1922)
 The Money Devil (1923)
 The Malay Junk (1924)
 The Hands of Orlac (1924)
 The Pearls of Doctor Talmadge (1925)
 Old Mamsell's Secret (1925)
 The Director General (1925)
 The Woman Who Did (1925)
 The Circus Princess (1925)
 The Most Beautiful Woman in Paris (1928)
 Rasputin, Demon with Women (1932)

Bibliography
 Ragowski, Christian. The Many Faces of Weimar Cinema: Rediscovering Germany's Filmic Legacy. Camden House, 2010.

External links

1899 births
1973 deaths
Emigrants from the Russian Empire to Germany
German actresses